S. spongiosa may refer to:
 Sauteria spongiosa, a liverwort species
 Scorias spongiosa, a sooty mould fungus species
 Spongiochloris spongiosa, a green alga species